The Men's 3.000 metres Steeplechase at the 2009 World Championships in Athletics was held at the Olympic Stadium in Berlin, Germany, on August 16 and August 18, 2009. Keeping in line with previous major championships success, the four-man Kenyan team entered for the event contained a number of race favourites.

The Kenyans were led by the reigning World and Olympic champion Brimin Kipruto, followed by 2004 Olympic champion and world-leader Ezekiel Kemboi, and finally Olympic medallists Paul Kipsiele Koech and Richard Mateelong. Two French athletes offered the strongest possibility of beating the Kenyans, with Olympic silver medallist Mahiedine Mekhissi-Benabbad and European record holder Bouabdellah Tahri. Other possible medallists were the in-form Moroccan Jamel Chatbi and the European Champion Jukka Keskisalo.

After Mekhissi-Benabbad pulled up due to injury in the heats, the chance of a Kenyan podium sweep increased. All three heats were won by a Kenyan athlete, and Kenyan-born Tareq Mubarak Taher, who now competes for Bahrain, was the fastest non-Kenyan qualifier. Chatbi, who had finished second in his heat, became the first athlete of the championships to test positive for banned substances. His "A" sample showed traces of clenbuterol and he was withdrawn from the final.

In the final, South African Ruben Ramolefi lead early on, but he was soon overtaken by Koech and Kemboi. Around the halfway mark, a group of five athletes were leading the field: the four Kenyan runners and Frenchman Tahri. Defending champion Kipruto was the only one to fall away from the leading pack and Koech, Kemboi, Mateelong were the first to reach the home stretch. In a close finish, Kemboi won in 8:00.43, and Mateelong took the silver. Tahri made a strong run to the line to upset the Kenyan's podium sweep hopes, beating Koech to the bronze and setting a new European record in the process. The top four runners had all beaten Moses Kiptanui's fourteen-year-old Championship record in what was the fastest ever steeplechase race at the World Championships.

Medalists

Records
Prior to the competition, the following records were as follows.

Qualification standards

Schedule

Results

Heats
Qualification: First 4 in each heat(Q) and the next 3 fastest(q) advance to the final.

Key:  DNF = Did not finish, NR = National record, Q = qualification by place in heat, q = qualification by overall place, SB = Seasonal best

DSQ - Disqualified (Chatbi disqualified due to violation of anti-doping rules)

Final

Key:  AR = Area record, CR = Championship record, DNS = Did not start, PB = Personal best, SB = Seasonal best

References
General
3000 metres steeplechase results (Archived 2009-09-08). IAAF. Retrieved on 2009-08-16.
Specific

3000 steeplechase
Steeplechase at the World Athletics Championships